"Just in Case" is a song written by J.P. Pennington and Sonny LeMaire of the band Exile, who recorded it on their 1984 album Kentucky Hearts. It served as the B-side to the album's single "Crazy for Your Love".

It was covered by American country music group The Forester Sisters.  It was released in November 1985 as the third single from the album The Forester Sisters. The song was The Forester Sisters' second number one on the country chart.  The single went to number one for one week in 1985.

Chart performance

References

1985 singles
Exile (American band) songs
The Forester Sisters songs
Songs written by J.P. Pennington
Warner Records singles
1984 songs
Songs written by Sonny LeMaire